Boško Abramović (Бошко Абрамовић; 14 February 1951 – 19 December 2021) was a Serbian chess grandmaster and selector of the national team.

Career
Abramović was awarded the FIDE International Master title in 1980 and the grandmaster title in 1984. He took 16th–20th place in the 1993 Biel Interzonal.

He died on 19 December 2021, at the age of 70.

References

External links
 
 

1951 births
2021 deaths
Chess grandmasters
Serbian chess players
Sportspeople from Zrenjanin